The 2021 Beef. It's What's For Dinner. 300 was a NASCAR Xfinity Series race held on February 13, 2021. It was contested over 122 laps-- extended from 120 laps due to an overtime finish -- on the  asphalt superspeedway. It was the first race of the 2021 NASCAR Xfinity Series season. Team Penske driver Austin Cindric, the reigning Xfinty Series champion, collected his first win of the season.

Background 
Daytona International Speedway is one of three superspeedways to hold NASCAR races, the other two being Indianapolis Motor Speedway and Talladega Superspeedway. The standard track at Daytona International Speedway is a four-turn superspeedway that is 2.5 miles (4.0 km) long. The track's turns are banked at 31 degrees, while the front stretch, the location of the finish line, is banked at 18 degrees.

Entry list

 (R) denotes rookie driver.
 (i) denotes driver who is ineligible for series driver points.

Practice

Qualifying
Austin Cindric was awarded the pole for the race as determined by 2020 owner points. Chris Cockrum, Ronnie Bassett Jr., Mario Gosselin, Tyler Reddick, and Jordan Anderson did not qualify.

Starting Lineups

Race

Race results

Stage Results
Stage One
Laps: 30

Stage Two
Laps: 30

Final Stage Results

Laps: 60

Race statistics
 Lead changes: 16 among 11 different drivers
 Cautions/Laps: 9 for 42
 Red flags: 1
 Time of race: 2 hours, 34 minutes, and 12 seconds
 Average speed:

References

NASCAR races at Daytona International Speedway
2021 in sports in Florida
Beef. It's What's For Dinner. 300
2021 NASCAR Xfinity Series